In 215 BC, Qin Shi Huang ordered General Meng Tian to set out against the Xiongnu tribes in the Ordos region, and establish a frontier region at the loop of the Yellow River. Believing that the Xiongnu were a possible threat, the emperor launched a preemptive strike against the Xiongnu with the intention to expand his empire.

Course
In 215 BC, Meng Tian succeeded in defeating the Xiongnu, driving them from the Ordos and seizing their homeland. After the catastrophic defeat at the hands of Meng Tian, the Xiongnu leader Touman was forced to flee far north into the Mongolian Plateau. As a result of the northward expansion, the threat that the Qin empire posed to the Xiongnu ultimately led to the reorganization of the many different Xiongnu tribes as they united into a confederacy against the unified Chinese state.

Aftermath
Following the victory against the nomads, Meng Tian was instructed to secure the frontier with a line of fortifications, which would become known as the Great Wall of China. Crown Prince Fusu and General Meng Tian were stationed at a garrison in Suide and soon began with the construction of the walled defenses, which would be connected with the old walls from the Qin, Yan, and Zhao states.

See also
 Qin's campaign against the Yue tribes
Zhao–Xiongnu War
 Han–Xiongnu War

References

Bibliography

 
 
 
 
 

Military history of the Qin dynasty
210s BC conflicts
Wars involving the Xiongnu
Wars involving Imperial China
Qin Shi Huang